Mon père avait raison is a 1996 French TV movie directed by Roger Vadim starring Marie-Christine Barrault, Claude Rich and Nicolas Vaude. It was based on a play by Sacha Guitry.

External links

1996 television films
1996 films
French television films
Films based on works by Sacha Guitry
1990s French films